Fominskaya is a rural locality (a village) in Morozovskoye Rural Settlement, Verkhovazhsky District, Vologda Oblast, Russia. The population was 69 as of 2002.

Geography 
The distance to Verkhovazhye is 25.3 km, to Morozovo is 1 km. Borovaya Pustosh, Olotinskaya, Mikhaylovskaya, Sboyevskaya, Silinskaya-1, Zakharovskaya, Morozovo, Mashkovskaya, Mininskaya are the nearest rural localities.

References 

Rural localities in Verkhovazhsky District